The Mystery of a Butcher's Shop is a 1929  mystery detective novel by the British writer Gladys Mitchell. It is the second in her long-running series featuring the psychoanalyst and amateur detective Mrs Bradley. It further established the reputation of the quick-witted Bradley who is some way ahead of the investigating police officers. Mitchell also employed a number of original touches that would continue during the series.

Synopsis
In the quaint village of Bossbury, joints of human meat are founding hanging from the hooks in the cold room of the butcher's shop. Meanwhile nearby a bishop discovers a skull while going for a swim by the seaside. Everything seems to point to the dead man being Rupert Sethleigh, who has gone missing although his cousin claims he has left for America.

References

Bibliography
 Klein, Kathleen Gregory. Great Women Mystery Writers: Classic to Contemporary. Greenwood Press, 1994.
 Miskimmin, Esme. 100 British Crime Writers. Springer Nature, 2020.
 Reilly, John M. Twentieth Century Crime & Mystery Writers. Springer, 2015.

1929 British novels
Novels by Gladys Mitchell
British crime novels
British mystery novels
British thriller novels
Novels set in England
British detective novels
Victor Gollancz Ltd books